Mike Bath (born September 11, 1977) is an American college football coach and former player. He is currently the running backs coach at Western Michigan University. Most recently he was the tight ends and fullbacks coach at the University of Wyoming. He served as interim head coach at Miami University (MU) during the 2013 season, replacing the fired Don Treadwell. Prior to his promotion, he was in the third year of his second stint as an assistant coach with the program. Bath originally began his coaching career at Miami from 2004 to 2008, serving as a graduate assistant for two years before being elevated to a full-time position. In between those two stints, he was the offensive coordinator, quarterbacks and wide receivers coach at Ashland University from 2009 to 2010.

Head coaching record

References

External links
 Western Michigan profile
 Wyoming profile

1977 births
Living people
American football quarterbacks
Ashland Eagles football coaches
Miami RedHawks football coaches
Miami RedHawks football players
Wyoming Cowboys football coaches
People from Celina, Ohio
Players of American football from Ohio